Cheonbosan is a mountain in Gyeonggi-do, South Korea. It can be found in the city of Yangju.

See also
List of mountains in Korea

References

Mountains of South Korea
Mountains of Gyeonggi Province